= Simzai railway station =

Pakistani railway station

Coordinates: 30.933039°N 69.117199°E

General information
- Owner: Ministry of Railways

Other information
- Station code: SZI

History
- Former names: Great Indian Peninsula Railway
Location

Simzai railway station (Urdu: سمزائی ریلوے اسٹیشن) is located in Pakistan.

== See also ==
- List of railway stations in Pakistan
- Pakistan Railways
